Queen Charlotte first appeared in online British sources in 1815 and was probably the salvaged , which had been sunk in 1813. From 1819 she traded with Brazil and Argentina and was burnt at Buenos Aires on 25 July 1822.

Origins
Queen Charlotte first appeared in the Register of Shipping (RS) in 1815 and in Lloyd's Register {LR) in 1816. However,  they reported that she had been launched in 1790 or 1801. Her size, launch years, the timing of her appearance in the registers is consistent with her being the Queen Charlotte that sank after a collision in 1813. It would require original research to perhaps settle the matter.

Career

Fate
Queen Charlotte arrived at Buenos Aires from Montevideo on 27 April 1821. She arrived at Buenos Aires from Patagonia on 20 September 1821.
 
Queen Charlotte, Moss, master, was burnt at Buenos Aires on 25 July 1822.

Citations

1815 ships
Age of Sail merchant ships of England
Maritime incidents in July 1822